Fongshan District is a district located in southern Kaohsiung, Taiwan. Fongshan is one of the administrative centers of Kaohsiung and is home to the Republic of China Military Academy. There are three military units currently located in Fongshan. Both the Republic of China Military Academy and R.O.C. Army Infantry School came to Taiwan from mainland China and were re-established here in 1950. Chung Cheng Armed Forces Preparatory School was established in 1976. These three units used to be the main economic driving force, but their importance diminished gradually as Fongshan has established itself as a conjunction between Pingtung City and Kaohsiung.

Although there are several industrial zones at the outskirts of the city, the major lifestyle in Fongshan seems to be very residential. Many apartments were built near the Kaohsiung city center as a result of shifting economic weight. Like most of areas in Taiwan, it also has many night markets scattered around within the city. Most of the night markets run until 2:00 am. Some of them are open on different days of a week, but some others are open all year round. Some of them are temporary, while others have become permanent establishments.

History
During the Dutch era, the current location of Fongshan was called Pongsoya (see Linbian, Pingtung), a group of eight Makatao villages and one of the most populous areas of Taiwan.

Qing Dynasty
During Qing rule,  included areas south of Tainan (then called "Taiwan-fu") and west of the mountains. In 1875, the southern part of Fongshan County was separated into .

Empire of Japan
In 1901, during Japanese rule,  was one of twenty local administrative offices established. According to the 1904 census, Hozan town had a population of 5,750, whereas Hozan District had a population 173,016. In 1909, this unit was merged into . From 1920 to 1945, under the prefecture system,  was administered under Hōzan District, Takao Prefecture. After the colonial government started to develop Takao Harbor in the early 20th century, the importance of Fongshan declined.

Republic of China
Fongshan was the capital of Kaohsiung County, and was established in 1945 as an urban township. It was upgraded to a county-administered city on 1 July 1972. On 24 December 2010, it was upgraded to a district and along with Lingya District has been the city seat of Kaohsiung City since that time.

Administrative divisions
The district consists of Xiankou, Chenggong, Guangming, Xingzhong, Nanxing, Hede, Fenggang, Zhonghe, Zhenbei, Xianya, Wenying, Zhenxi, Zhentung, Beiding, Zhongzheng, Zhennan, Laoye, Ruizhu, Zhongyi, Chengyi, Xinxing, Haiguang, Zhongcheng, Xinjia, Wuhan, Zhengyi, Yijia, Fuxing, Tungmen, Ruixing, Tianxing, Xinjiang, Guotai, Fengtung, Xinfu, Guoguang, Guolong, Wende, Guobei, Caogong, Xingren, Wufu, Zhongxiao, Shengming, Hexing, Xiehe, Wenshan, Fucheng, Chengde, Sanmin, Beimen, Fujia, Nancheng, Wenhua, Dade, Wusong, Wenheng, Wenfu, Chengxin, Chengzhi, Guofu, Wuqing, Haiyang, Xinwu, Xinle, Xintai, Zhonglun, Zhongrong, Zhongmin, Erjia, Longcheng, Furong, Shanmei, Nanhe, Fuxiang and Baoan Villages.

Climate
Fongshan has a tropical climate. The average temperature is 23°C (73.4°F). The average precipitation is 1,500 to 2,000 millimeters (59 to 79 inches).

Government institutions
 Kaohsiung City Council

Education
 National FengHsin Senior High School
 National Fengshan Senior High School
 National FongShan Senior Commercial & Industrial Vocational School

Tourist attractions
 Shuangci Pavilion (Mazu) Temple
 Caogong Temple
 Chenghuang Temple
 Chenglan Fort
 Dadong Arts Center
 Dadong Wetlands Park
 Dongbian Gate
 Dongfu Bridge
 Fengshan Gongtong Market
 Fengshan Longshan Temple
 Fengshan Tiangong Temple
 Fongshan Stadium
 Fongshan Community Culture Museum
 Fongyi Tutorial Academy
 Former Japanese Navy Fongshan Communication Center
 Kaohsiung City Symphony Orchestra
 Pingcheng Fort
 Shuangcih Pavilion
 Syunfong Fort
 Weiwuying Metropolitan Park
 Zhonghua Street Night Market

Transportation

Roads
 National Highway No. 1
 Provincial Highway No. 1
 Provincial Highway No. 1E
 Provincial Highway No. 25
 Provincial Highway No. 88

Rails
 Fongshan West Station, Fongshan Station, Dadong Station and Fongshan Junior High School Station of the Kaohsiung Mass Rapid Transit
 Fengshan railway station of Taiwan Railways Administration

Notable natives
 Chang Chun-yen, former electrical engineer and professor
 Chen Chi-chuan, Mayor of Kaohsiung (1960–1968)
 Kang Kang, singer and television host
 Lin Ching-hsuan, former writer
 Sammi Kao, singer
 Tyzen Hsiao, composer, pianist and conductor

See also
 Walled City of Fongshan

Notes

References

External links

 

Districts of Kaohsiung